Johann Bezzina (born 30 May 1994 in Malta) is a Maltese footballer who plays for Birkirkara of the Maltese Premier League.

Career
Making his senior debut for Hibernians in a 2-5 loss to Qormi at the age of 16, Bezzina was loaned to Sliema Wanderers in 2015, lifting the Maltese FA Trophy that season. After returning to Hibernians in 2016, the midfielder recorded his 100th appearance in the Maltese Premier League in a 2-0 win over Valletta, consolidating his first team spot in the process.

On 8 January 2019, Bezzina was sold to Birkirkara for a fee around €100,000.

References

External links 
 
 

1994 births
Living people
Hibernians F.C. players
Sliema Wanderers F.C. players
Birkirkara F.C. players
Maltese Premier League players
Association football midfielders
Maltese footballers
Malta international footballers